In the mythology of Fiji, Samulayo is a god or spirit of war and those dead souls who died in battle.

He lives in underworld.

References 

Fijian deities
War gods